During the early modern era pupils, former pupils and teachers at English public schools developed and wrote down the first codes of football, most notably the Eton College (1815) and Aldenham school (1825) football rules. The best-known of these is rugby football (1845). British public schools football also directly influenced the rules of association football.

Private schools ("public schools" in England and Wales), mainly attended by boys from the more affluent upper, upper-middle, and professional classes, are widely credited with three key achievements in the creation of modern codes of football. First, the evidence suggests that, during the 16th century, they transformed the popular, but violent and chaotic, "mob football" into organised team sports that were beneficial to schoolboys. Second, many early references to football in literature were recorded by people who had studied at these schools, showing they were familiar with the game. Finally, in the 19th century, former English public school boys, in a meeting organised by two old-boys of Shrewsbury, were the first to write down formal codes of rules in order to enable matches to be played between different schools.  These versions of football rules were the basis of both the Cambridge Rules and the subsequent rules of association football, of which only one copy survives in the library of Shrewsbury.

History of football

14th century
That football were probably played at English public schools from earliest times is suggested by early references to such games being played by students at university. In later centuries there is no doubt that football games played at school were taken by former students to university. The earliest reference to ball games at English Universities comes from 1303 when "Thomas of Salisbury, a student of Oxford University, found his brother Adam dead, and it was alleged that he was killed by Irish students, whilst playing the ball in the High Street towards Eastgate". The earliest specific reference to football (pila pedalis) at university comes in 1555 when it was outlawed at St John's College, Oxford.  Similar decrees followed shortly after at Cambridge University.

15th and 16th centuries
The first direct evidence that games probably resembling football was being played at English public schools comes from the Vulgaria by William Horman in 1519. Horman had been headmaster at Eton (1485/6–1494/5) and Winchester College. His Latin textbook includes a translation exercise with the phrase "We wyll playe with a ball full of wynde", a rough translation of the original Latin "Lusui erit follis pugillari spiritu tumens", which Francis Peabody Magoun translated as "In sport we shall have a ball inflated with air to kick". Even as early as 1519, Horman shows us that he was well aware of the value of sports to children's education and the need to temper their enthusiasm in order not to affect their studies: "There muste be a measure in gyuynge of remedies or sportynge to chyldren, leste they be wery of goynge to theyr boke if they haue none, or waxe slacke if they haue to many".

This conflict was discussed further by Christopher Johnson who was headmaster at Winchester in the 1560s, but clearly remained a dilemma for public school masters right up to modern times.  Christopher Johnson mentions the activities which he enjoyed when a scholar at Winchester himself between 1549 and 1553. He says that he: "cared much more for balls, quoits and tops than he did for books and school".

Sir Henry Wotton who was at Winchester in the 1560s under Christopher Johnson makes reference to the English word "football" in one of his poems.

Richard Mulcaster, a former student at Eton and later headmaster at Merchant Taylors' School (1561) and St Paul's School (1596) has been described as "the greatest sixteenth Century advocate of football". He tells us that towards the end of the 16th century football in England had grown to "greatnes ... [and was] much used ... in all places". Mulcaster's unique contribution is not only referring to "footeball" by its correct English name but also providing the earliest evidence of organised team football. Mulcaster confirms that his was a game closer to modern football by differentiating it from games involving other parts of the body, namely "the hand ball" and "the armeball". He referred to the many benefits of his "footeball" in his personal publication of 1581 in English entitled 'Positions Wherein Those Primitive Circumstances Be Examined, Which Are Necessarie for the Training up of Children'. He states that football had positive educational value and it promoted health and strength. Mulcaster's discussion on the merits of football was the first to refer to teams ("sides" and "parties"), positions ("standings"), the benefits of a referee ("judge over the parties") and a coach "(trayning maister)".  Although it is not explicitly mentioned, passing of the ball is strongly implied by the reference to different positions on the field. Mulcaster describes a game for small teams that is organised under the auspices of a referee (and is therefore clear evidence that his game had evolved from disordered and violent "mob" football): "Some smaller number with such overlooking, sorted into sides and standings, not meeting with their bodies so boisterously to trie their strength: nor shouldring or shuffing one another so barbarously ... may use footeball for as much good to the body, by the chiefe use of the legges".  As a result of his enthusiasm for the sport and his accurate description of the modern game Richard Mulcaster is considered the father of early modern football.

In 1591, it is clear that ball games were being played at Lyon's Free Grammar School in Harrow'. He says that "upon Thursday only sometimes when the weather is fine, and upon Saturday, or half-holidays after evening prayer. And their play shall be to drive a top, to toss a handball, to run, or to shoot".

17th century Scotland
There is evidence that the modern game as we know it where "hand tossing“ was disallowed and where a player "kept goal" was actually invented at Aberdeen Grammar School in Scotland, in the mid 17th century. In 1633 (cited in other references as 1636), David Wedderburn, a teacher from Aberdeen, mentioned elements of football games in a short Latin textbook called the "Vocabula". Wedderburn cites phrases that school boys might use during their game.  The text below is given in two forms: Francis Peabody Magoun's 1938 original (and more literal) translation and then Marples 1956 version.  It is noteworthy that Magoun does not use the word to "pass".

Let us choose sides//Let's pick sides.
pick your man first//You have first choice.
Those on our side come here//Those who are on our side, come over here.
How many are against us?/How many are there in the other team?
Kick out the ball so that we may begin the game/Kick off, so that we can begin the match.
Come, kick it here/Pass it here.
You keep the goal/You keep goal.
Snatch the ball from that fellow if you can/Get hold of the ball before he does, if you can manage it.
Come, throw yourself against him/Go on, intercept him.
Run at him/Charge him.
Kick the ball back/Pass the ball back.
Well done.  You aren't doing anything/Well done! You’re slacking.
To make a goal/To score a goal.
This is the first goal, this the second, this the third/This is the second, this the third goal.
Drive that man back/Keep him out, otherwise the other side wins.
The opponents are, moreover, coming out on top, If you don't look out, he will make a goal/If you’re not careful, he’ll score in a minute.
Unless we play better, we'll be done for/If we don’t play better, we’re done for.
Ah, victory is in your hands/Hi! You’re the winners.
Ha, hurrah. He is a very skilled ball player/Hurrah! He’s a very good player.
Had it not been for him, we should have brought back the victory/If it has been for him we should have won.
Come, help me. We still have the better chance/Come on, help me. We still have a better side?"

(The original Latin is cited by Magoun (1938): Sortiamur partes; tu primum socium dilige; Qui sunt nostrarum partium huc se recipient; Quot nobis adversantur; Excute pilam ut ineamus certamen; Age, huc percute; Tu tuere metum; Praeripe illi pilam si possis agere; Age objice te illi; Occurre illi; Repercute pilam; Egregie. Nihil agis; Transmittere metum pila; Hic primus est transmissus. Hic secundus, hic tertius est transmissus; Repelle eum, alioqui, adversarii evadunt superiores; Nisi cavesjam occupabit metam; Ni melius a nobis ludatur, de nobis actum est.  Eia penes vos victoria est; Io triumphe. Est pilae doctissimus; Asque eo fuisset, reportassimus vicoriam; Age, subservi mihi; Adhuc potiores habemus, scilicet partes)

Wedderburn's Latin book is an early reference to what has been rendered in the second version of the translation as "passing" the ball. The word "passing" is not used explicitly:  the original Latin states "huc percute" (strike it here) and "repercute pilam" (strike it back - or again). The original word translated as "goal" is "metum", literally meaning the "pillar at each end of the circus course" in a Roman chariot race.   The sentence given as "intercept him" in the second translation above is translated in the original as "Throw yourself against him" (Age, objice te illi). There is a reference to "get hold of the ball before [another player] does" or to "snatch" it (Praeripe illi pilam si possis agere) suggesting that handling of the ball was allowed. It is clear that the tackles allowed included the "charging" and pushing/holding of opposing players ("Keep him out" above, "drive that man back" in the original, "repelle eum" in original Latin). This game is likely to have been similar to rugby football. Contrary to press reports in 2006 there is no reference to game rules, marking players, team formations, or forward passing. This text was described in 2006 as "an amazing new discovery" but has actually been well documented in football history literature since the early 20th century and available on the internet since at least 2000.  It confirms that organised football games in the 17th century were not confined to English Schools. (An earlier description of goals, defending goals and passing the ball comes from Carew's account of Cornish Hurling).

The next specific mention of football at public schools can be found in a Latin poem by Robert Matthew, a Winchester scholar from 1643 to 1647. He describes how "...we may play quoits, or hand-ball, or bat-and-ball, or football; these games are innocent and lawful. ..".  That football at winchester was "innocent and lawful" at this time is very noteworthy. This is strongly supportive of the fact that by the mid-17th century football and other ball games in English public schools had been tamed. Nugae Etonenses (1766) by T. Frankland also mentions the "Football Fields" at Eton.

A more detailed description of football is given in Francis Willughby's Book of Sports, written in about 1660.  This account is particularly noteworthy as he refers to football by its correct name and is the first to describe the following:  goals and a pitch ("a close that has a gate at either end.  The gates are called Goals"), tactics ("leaving some of their best players to guard the goal"), scoring ("they that can strike the ball through their opponents' goal first win") and the way teams were selected ("the players being equally divided according to their strength and nimbleness"). He is the first to describe a law of football:  "They often break one another's shins when two meet and strike both together against the ball, and therefore there is a law that they must not strike higher than the ball". His account of the ball itself is also very informative:  "They blow a strong bladder and tie the neck of it as fast as they can, and then put it into the skin of a bull's cod and sew it fast in".  He adds: "The harder the ball is blown, the better it flies. They used to put quicksilver into it sometimes to keep it from lying still".   His book includes the first (basic) diagram illustrating a football pitch. Willughby's link with the public school system was that he had studied at Sutton Coldfield school, was a student at Cambridge University and frequented the Bodleian Library at Oxford University.

18th century
In 1710, football was recorded as being played on the green at Westminster School and the Abbey Chapter failing to repress it.

19th century
The earliest versions of any football code rules were written down in the early 19th century, most notably by Eton College (1815)
and Aldenham School (1825).

By the early 19th century, (before the Factory Act of 1850), most working class people in Britain had to work six days a week, often for more than twelve hours a day. They had neither the time nor the inclination to engage in sport for recreation and, at the time, many children were part of the labour force. Feast day football on the public highway was at an end. Thus the public school boys, who were free from constant toil, became the inventors of organised football games with formal codes of rules. These gradually evolved into the modern football and rugby games that we know today.

The boom in rail transport in Britain during the 1840s meant that people were able to travel further and with less inconvenience than they ever had before. Inter-school sporting competitions became possible. While local rules for athletics could be easily understood by visiting schools, it was nearly impossible for schools to play each other at football, as each school played by its own rules.

Oldest School Football Clubs
These are the earliest schools to have evidence of regular, organised football. Each school would originally have played its own code.

Aldenham School F.C. was reported in The Football Annual 1873 (Charles Alcock) to have been founded in 1825 but there are no primary sources to support this and it is disputed.

The earliest known matches involving public schools are as follows:

9 December 1834: Eton College v. Harrow School.
 1840s: Old Rugbeians v. Old Salopians (played at Cambridge University).
1840s: Old Rugbeians v. Old Salopians (played at Cambridge University the following year).
1852: Harrow School v. Westminster School.
13 February 1856: Charterhouse School v. St Bartholemew's Hospital.
1857: Haileybury College v. Westminster School.
24 February 1858: Forest School v. Chigwell School.
1858: Westminster School v. Winchester College.
24 November 1858: Westminster School v. Dingley Dell Club.

Rugby football
William Webb Ellis, a pupil at Rugby school, is said to have "showed a fine disregard for the rules of football, as played in his time" by picking up the ball and running to the opponents' goal in 1823. This act is popularly said to be the beginnings of Rugby football, but the evidence for this bold act does not stand up to close examination and most sports historians believe the story to be apocryphal. In older forms of football, handling the ball was allowed, or even compulsory; for example, the English writer William Hone, writing in 1825 or 1826, quotes the social commentator Sir Frederick Morton Eden, regarding "Foot-Ball", as played at Scone, Scotland:
The game was this: he who at any time got the ball into his hands, run [sic] with it till overtaken by one of the opposite part; and then, if he could shake himself loose from those on the opposite side who seized him, he run on; if not, he threw the ball from him, unless it was wrested from him by the other party, but no person was allowed to kick it.

In 1845, three boys at Rugby school, William Delafield Arnold, W. W. Shirley and Frederick Hutchins, were tasked with codifying the rules then being used at the school. This further assisted the spread of the Rugby game.

During the early 19th century the Rugby school rules appear to have spread at least as far, perhaps further, than the other schools' games. For example, two clubs which claim to be the world's first and/or oldest football club, in the sense of one which is not part of a school or university, are both strongholds of rugby football: the Barnes Club, said to have been founded in 1839, and Guy's Hospital Football Club, reportedly founded in 1843. Neither date nor the variety of football played is well documented, but such claims nevertheless allude to the popularity of rugby before other modern codes emerged.

The first inter-school match was played between Cheltenham College and Rugby school, 
surprisingly the victors being Cheltenham College, still a prolific rugby school.
First played in 1864 the Clifton v Marlborough game lays claim to being the first inter-school Rugby fixture. The fixture continues today and the winning side is presented with the Governor's Cup. The Cup was once a polo trophy of the Governor of Jamaica.

The great majority of public schools now play rugby football as a major sport.

Association football
Association football had come to be adopted by a number of public schools as a way of encouraging esprit de corps, competitiveness and keeping youths fit. Each school drafted their own rules to suit the dimensions of their playing field. The rules varied widely between different schools and were changed over time with each new intake of pupils. Soon, a number of schools of thought about how association football should be played emerged. Some schools favoured a game in which the ball could be carried (as at Rugby, Marlborough and Cheltenham).

Others preferred a game where dribbling the ball was promoted (in particular Eton, Shrewsbury and Harrow).  This kind of dribbling foot ball with a tight offside rule is still played today as the Eton field game.  A third group led by Westminster and Charterhouse pursued a game that excluded handling the ball but had a less restrictive offside rule. There is some evidence that this became a passing game since it allowed forward passes.

The division into these camps was partly the result of circumstances in which the games were played. At Charterhouse and Westminster, both schools at the time played on restricted sites in London, the boys were confined to playing their ball game within the cloisters making the rough and tumble of the handling game difficult. At Forest School, Walthamstow, matches were played on The Common where chestnut trees and iron railings bounding the playing field were in play. Most of the founding members of The Football Association in 1863 were former schoolboys at these public schools.  Punch referred to them as "Public School professors of the art [of football]".

This led to a conflict in the way that association football should be played.  Some committee members favoured the rules of Charterhouse and Westminster School and pushed for a passing game, in particular rules that allowed forward passing ("passing on"). Other schools (in particular Eton and Harrow) favoured a dribbling game with a tight off-side rule (such that all players must remain behind the ball). By 1867 the Football Association had chosen in favour of the Charterhouse and Westminster game and adopted an off-side rule that permitted forward passing. The modern forward-passing soccer game was thus born, as a direct consequence of Charterhouse and Westminster Football.

Between the Wars a substantial number of independent schools switched codes from soccer to rugby, but this trend did not continue, and at least one, City of London School, switched from rugby to soccer a few years ago. In addition, many independent schools now offer both codes, and in some schools, including Eton, Winchester, Charterhouse and Westminster, association football is a major sport.

Other codes

Three schools maintain their own association football games: the Field Game and the Wall Game at Eton; Harrow Football; and Winchester Football.

School Football games also had an influence on the origins of Australian rules football.  The earliest recorded association football matches in Australia were English school association football matches. The game played in 1858 between Melbourne Grammar and Scotch College is officially acknowledged as the first game of Australian rules football, and the annual game between these schools, now known as the Cordner-Eggleston Cup, is the longest-running school fixture of any of the world's association football codes.

Contributions to the rules

Offside
Each of the English public school games had its own offside rule.  Many of these completely prevented forward passing.  The 1847 rules of Eton College, however, were probably the first to resemble the modern game, stating:

"A player is considered 'sneaking' when only three or less than three of the opposite side are before him and the ball behind him, and in such a case, he may not kick the ball."

This is noteworthy as it allowed players to receive a forward pass if more than three opponents were between them and the opponents' goal line.

Dribbling, passing, "scientific football" and the "combination game"
Dribbling and passing of the ball (including forward passing) are all parts of public school games. In addition, the introduction of the FA rules that allowed both dribbling and forward passing of the ball were instigated by former public school boys.  These key elements of modern Association football were taken from the various versions of public school association football. Dribbling was a key part of the Eton game and passing, in particular forward passing ("passing on") was argued for by representatives of Charterhouse during the establishment of the Football Association rules in the 1860s. These features of modern soccer had been integrated into the Football Association rules by 1867 and were the consequence of English public school games.

In 1856 Lancing College created its own code of association football which was regarded as a means of fostering teamwork.

"Scientific" football is first described in 1862 at Rugby School: here one could see "scientific play", magnificent "drops" and "gallant run ins". It is uncertain if the drops and run-ins constituted what the author meant by "scientific", however it is made clear that this playing style was distinctly less "vicious" than in the past. Clearly there was something systematic about scientific rugby. Further references to scientific play come in match accounts in the 1860s, including to games under the Association rules.

Certain association football historians correctly point out that the forward pass is not permitted in rugby football and therefore see the emergence of the forward pass as a critical development in the evolution of association football (and for this reason do not acknowledge the role of the public school games). They forget, however, that passing the ball forward by kicking is not only completely legal in Rugby but also is a regular tactic employed in most matches—particularly in open, running play. For this reason the public school games can claim to be origin of the forward-passing game. Passing the ball continues to this day in surviving traditional public school association football games. Even in Harrow Football, which is essentially a dribbling game, the ball may be chipped into the hands of a team-mate.

Most notably the "Combination game" (the predecessor of the modern style of association football involving a lot of player to player passing) is believed to have been invented by the Royal Engineers A.F.C. in the early 1870s. Nearly all of these players were from English public schools.

Kicking off from the centre
This was a key feature of the football codes of Harrow and Rugby.

Goal crossbar
The cross bar to the association football goal was a feature of the Eton game and was noteworthy as the ball had to pass under the bar (instead of over it, as in Rugby football).  The Sheffield Rules of 1862 later included both crossbars and half time and free kicks were introduced to their code in 1866 or before. In Harrow football, however, there is no crossbar, quite literally two rugby posts without their crossbar. A base is scored when the ball is hit between the posts.

Team size
Eleven or fifteen players per side was a feature of association football at Eton and Winchester.

The football season
Evidence for the establishment of the football season at English public schools comes in "Bentley's miscellany" (1844). 
In a chapter entitled "Eton Scenes and Eton Men" the seasonal sports cycle is described thus: 
"Tamer boys play at cricket in the Summer and Hockey in the Winter; but the manlier youths pull in the boats during the Summer and play at Football in the winter".  See also the quotation below which confirms that the association football season began in Autumn.  This is noteworthy because traditionally association football had been played in England during Shrovetide.

Games between clubs
School association football clubs (and other sports) were a central part of life at 19th century English public schools.  In "Five years at an English University" (1852), American Charles Bristed describes his time at Cambridge University in the 1840s.  During a discussion on Eton and Rugby School (drawn upon letters from former students there) he states:  "[A boy is] proud of the house he belongs to as a man of his college; though in cricket and association football clubs, in regular "long boats" and aquatic sweepstakes, in running and leaping races, he competes with the whole school, yet he belongs to a association football club in the autumn, which includes the twenty or thirty boys boarding in his own house and thus matches are made between houses as between colleges". Significantly this shows evidence of the first organised competitions between association football teams not just within schools but between them. For competitions to take place between colleges it would clearly require some agreement over rules of the game. This necessity, combined with the availability of sufficient time and money to pursue the sport, was the driving force that led to the creation of modern association football rules by people who had studied or taught at English public schools and universities.  This quotation also points to the establishment in English public schools of the "football season" which to this day begins without fail in Autumn.

Team colours
The earliest evidence of coloured shirts used to identify association football teams – the tradition of wearing distinctive team strips (i.e. uniforms) — comes from early English public school association football games, for example an image of Winchester football from before 1840 is entitled: "A 'Hot' at Foot Ball. The commoners have red and the college boys blue jerseys".

House sporting colours are mentioned in Rugby football (rule XXI) as early as 1845: "No player may wear cap or jersey without leave from the head of his house". Similarly, in 1848 it was noted at Rugby that "Considerable improvement has taken place in the last few years, in the appearance of a match... in the use of peculiar dress consisting of velvet caps and jerseys". The use of coloured shirts at Winchester college are confirmed again in 1859: "Precisely at twelve o'clock, according to good old custom, the blue jerseys of college and the red of commoners mingled in the grand commencing 'hot'".

At soccer, Winchester wear dark blue shirts to signify their connection with Oxford University, specifically New College, and Eton light blue, since they are linked to King's College, Cambridge.

Half-time
The division of the game into two-halves was initiated to allow games between schools. The rules of one school would be played by for the first half, and the rules of the other school in the second half.  Changing ends at half time (if no goals had been scored) was part of the following schools codes:  Brighton, Eton, Rossall, Sheffield, Winchester.  Other schools changed every time that side scored (Cheltenham, FA, Harrow, Marlborough, Rugby, Shrewsbury, Uppingham schools)

Substitutes
The origin of association football substitutes goes back to at least the early 1860s as part of English public school association football games. The original use of the term "substitute" in association football was to describe the replacement of players who failed to turn up for matches.  For example, in 1863, a match reports states:  "The Charterhouse eleven played a match in cloisters against some old Carthusians but in consequence of the non-appearance of some of those who were expected it was necessary to provide three substitutes." The substitution of absent players happened as early as the 1850s, for example from Eton where the term "emergencies" is used Numerous references to players acting as a "substitute" occur in soccer matches in the mid-1860s where it is not indicated whether these were replacements of absent players or of players injured during the match.

The throw-in
The modern throw-in comes from the 19th century English public school association football games.  In these codes of association football a variety of methods of returning the ball into play from touch were used.  The modern throw-in draws upon various aspects of a number early English school games. For example, returning the ball by throwing it out was part of the Rugby and Cheltenham association football rules. Like the modern association football throw-in the direction was not specified.  The Sheffield rules instigated the throw in of the ball at right angles by the opposite side to the one that played it into touch. The two handed throw in is part of rugby union football—see "line out".  That the first side reaching the ball must throw it out (at right angles, in this case) was part of the Football Association rules and the Rossall rules.  The 1863 Cambridge Rules state that "In a match when half the time agreed upon has elapsed, the side shall change goals when the ball is next out of play".

References

See also
 Harrow Football
 Eton wall game
 Eton field game
 Winchester College Football
 History of rugby union
 History of rugby league

Traditional football
School sport in the United Kingdom
Public school football games